Harm is a Dutch masculine given name. It's a short form of Harmen (Herman) and is most common in the North East of the Netherlands. People with the name include:

Harm Bart (born 1942), Dutch mathematician and economist
Harm Beertema (born 1952), Dutch PVV politician
Harm de Blij (1935–2014), Dutch-born American geographer
Harm Bouckaert (born 1934), Dutch-American art dealer
Harm Brouwer (born 1957), Dutch Labour Party politician
Harm van den Dorpel (born 1981), Dutch conceptual artist in Berlin
Harm van Houten (1892–1952), Dutch journalist and politician
Harm Jansen (born 1967), Dutch road bicycle racer
Harm Kamerlingh Onnes (1893–1985), Dutch painter, draughtsman, and ceramist
Harm Klueting (born 1949), German historian and theologian
Harm Kolthek (1872–1946), Dutch printer, journalist, trade unionist and politician
Harm Kuipers (born 1947), Dutch speed skater
Harm Lagaay (born 1946), Dutch automobile designer
Harm van der Meulen (1925–2007), Dutch trade unionist and politician
Harm Osmers (born 1985), German football referee
Harm Ottenbros (born 1943), Dutch road bicycle racer
Harm G. Schröter (born 1948), German economist
Harm Vanhoucke (born 1996), Belgian road bicycle racer
Harm van Veldhoven (born 1962), Dutch-Belgian football player and manager 
Harm Wiersma (born 1953), Dutch world champion in draughts
Harm Zeinstra (born 1989), Dutch footballer

Fictional
 Capt. Harmon "Harm" Rabb, a character on the U.S. TV series JAG

References

Dutch masculine given names